Richard Halliwell Gaskell (11 October 1905 – 23 June 1983) was an English association footballer who played as an inside forward. Born in Wigan, he started his career with Football League Third Division North side Wigan Borough in September 1926. Two years later, Gaskell joined fellow Third Division North club Nelson on a free transfer. One of several new players signed by Nelson during the 1927–28 campaign, he made his debut for the club in the 0–3 defeat away at Durham City on 4 February 1928. Gaskell struggled to make an impact at Seedhill and played just two more matches for Nelson, his final appearance coming in the 0–4 loss to New Brighton on 3 March 1928. He left the club at the end of the season and had a spell with Westhoughton Collieries before returning to the Football League with Bolton Wanderers in February 1929.

Gaskell moved to Darwen in August 1929 and went on to play for Chorley and Parbold before retiring in 1932. Outside of football, he worked as a schoolteacher and was the assistant headmaster at Highfields Secondary Boys' School in Wigan.

References

1905 births
1983 deaths
Footballers from Wigan
English footballers
Association football forwards
Wigan Borough F.C. players
Nelson F.C. players
Bolton Wanderers F.C. players
Darwen F.C. players
Chorley F.C. players
English Football League players